Daniel Marins Rodrigues, sometimes known as just Daniel (born March 14, 1988 in Rio de Janeiro), is a Brazilian striker. He currently plays for Figueirense.

Contract
January 1, 2007 to December 31, 2007

External links
 figueirense.com
 CBF
 sambafoot
 Guardian Stats Centre

Brazilian footballers
Figueirense FC players
1988 births
Living people
Association football forwards
Footballers from Rio de Janeiro (city)